Assar Mossberg was a Swedish footballer who played as a defender.

References

Association football defenders
Swedish footballers
Allsvenskan players
Malmö FF players
Year of birth missing
Year of death missing